"How'm I Gonna Sleep" is a song by New Zealand musician, Tim Finn, released in March 1989 as the lead single from his third studio album, Tim Finn. The song reached number 2 on the New Zealand charts and number 27 in Australia.

Track listing
Australian/New Zealand  7" single (CP 2201)
A. "How'm I Gonna Sleep" - 3:54
B. "Cruel Black Crow" - 4:02

Australian/New Zealand  CD single (CDED 409)
 "How'm I Gonna Sleep" - 3:54
 "Cruel Black Crow" - 4:02
 "Six Months in a Leaky Boat" (live) (featuring Neil Finn) - 2:55

Charts

References

1989 songs
1989 singles
Songs written by Tim Finn
Capitol Records singles
Song recordings produced by Mitchell Froom